= Axius River =

Axius River may refer to:

- The Vardar, a river in Macedonia and Greece
- The Orontes, a river in Lebanon, Syria, and Turkey
